Iván Adam Granados (born September 30, 1985) is a Spanish-Venezuelan born professional baseball pitcher, who is currently a free agent.

Granados played for the Arizona League team in the Oakland Athletics farm system in 2005 and 2006. He then joined the División de Honor de Béisbol in Spain in 2007. Additionally, he played for the Tenerife Marlins from 2008 to 2010 and then joined the T & A San Marino of the Italian League for 2011. In 2013 and 2014, he served as a starting pitcher for the HCAW club of the Dutch Honkbal Hoofdklasse.

In between, Granados has played for the Spain national baseball team in the 2007 Baseball World Cup, the 2008 European Cup, and the 2013 World Baseball Classic.

References

External links
, or Pura Pelota (Venezuelan Winter League)

Living people
1985 births
2013 World Baseball Classic players
Águilas del Zulia players
Arizona League Athletics players
Baseball pitchers
People from Cojedes (state)
Spanish baseball players
T & A San Marino players
Expatriate baseball players in San Marino
Venezuelan baseball players
Venezuelan expatriate baseball players in Italy
Venezuelan expatriate sportspeople in the Netherlands
HCAW players
Expatriate baseball players in the Netherlands